The 1980 edition of the Campeonato Carioca kicked off on August 17, 1980 and ended on November 30, 1980. It is the official tournament organized by FFERJ (Federação de Futebol do Estado do Rio de Janeiro, or Rio de Janeiro State Football Federation). Only clubs based in the Rio de Janeiro State are allowed to play. Eighteen teams contested this edition. Fluminense won the title for the 24th time. Serrano and Olaria were relegated.

System
The tournament would be divided in four stages:
 Torneio Seletivo: That phase would be disputed by the seven worst teams of the loser's group in last year's championship. the seven teams all played in a single round-robin format against each other and the three best teams qualified to the main championship.
 Taça João Baptista Coelho Netto: The fourteen teams all played in a single round-robin format against each other. The champions qualified to the Finals, and the four worst teams were eliminated.
 Taça Gustavo de Carvalho: The ten remaining teams all played in a single round-robin format against each other. The champions qualified to the Finals.
 Final phase: The champions of the two stages would play each other in one match. The winners won the title.

Championship

Taça Guanabara
Played from July until August, this was the last edition of the Taça Guanabara as a tournament separate from the Campeonato Carioca.

Torneio Seletivo

Taça João Baptista Coelho Netto

Playoffs

Taça Gustavo de Carvalho

Aggregate table

Finals

References

Campeonato Carioca seasons
Carioca